Chondrodermatitis nodularis chronica helicis is a small, nodular, tender, chronic inflammatory lesion occurring on the helix of the ear, most often in men. it often presents as a benign painful erythematous nodule fixed to the cartilage of the helix or antihelix of the external ear. Although the exact cause of the condition is unknown, it has been linked to head pressure on the ear while sleeping. Treatment options include the use of pressure-relieving devices or, in cases where that is not an option, surgery.

See also 
 List of cutaneous conditions

References 

Dermal and subcutaneous growths